Aldo Signoretti (born 1953/54) is an Italian make-up artist. He has been nominated three times for the Academy Award for Best Makeup, the first time for his work in Moulin Rouge! (2001), the second time for his work in Apocalypto (2006), and the third time for his work in Il divo (2010).

References

External links
 

Italian make-up artists
Emmy Award winners
Year of birth missing (living people)
Living people
Place of birth missing (living people)